Giorgos Petridis (10 February 1938 – 2 February 2017) was a Greek professional footballer who played as an attacking midfielder and a later manager.

Club career
Petridis started his career at Pera Club in the local divisions of Athens and with his impressive performances and his talent he attracted the interest of the big teams. In 1957, the doctor and vice-president of AEK Athens, Loutsidis, who knew him, mediated his transfer to the club, which took place under the presidency of Nikos Goumas. AEK gave some sports equipment to Pera Club, as exchange for his transfer.

Petridis joined a very strong AEK with great players, such as Nestoridis, Poulis, Kanakis, Emmanouilidis. He made his debut replacing Kanakis who at that time had come into conflict the coach, Vittore Martini. He impressed with his performances competing as an attacking midfielder as well as an attacker. He scored a hat-trick on 16 December 1961 a 3–6 away win against Panelefsiniakos. On 23 December 1962 he impressed with his performance in the derby against Olympiacos at Karaiskakis Stadium where AEK won by 3–1. In that season AEK, coached by Jenő Csaknády and with the attacking duo of Nestoridis-Papaioannou, impressed and finally won the title after a play-off match against Panathinaikos. During his spell at AEK Athens, he won the Championship of 1963 and 2 Cups.

In the summer of 1966 Petridis left AEK and although he had a tempting offer to continue his career in Australia, he was influenced by his mother and decided to stay in Greece and eventually move to Vyzas Megara, where he played for a year before ending his career as a footballer.

International career

Petridis appeared once with Greece in 1963. He did so on 16 October 1963 in a friendly home 3–1 win against Poland, under his former manager at AEK, Tryfon Tzanetis, coming in as replacement of Giannis Cholevas at the 46th minute and scoring the last goal of the match 20 minutes later.

Managerial career
After the end of his career as a footballer Petridis became involved in coaching. He worked at Panarkadikos, Eordaikos, Levadiakos and AEL among others, while he was also assistant to Todor Veselinović at AEK. Later he was for a number of years in the training team of the academies of AEK.

Personal life
Petridis was a good friend, best man and neighbor with the AEK Athens legend, Kleanthis Maropoulos. He died on 2 February 2017, at the age of 78, in a car accident. Coincidentally, another former player of AEK Athens and Petridis' former teammate, Miltos Papapostolou also died on the same day.

Honours

AEK Athens
Alpha Ethniki: 1962–63
Greek Cup: 1963–64, 1965–66

References

External links

1938 births
2017 deaths
Greece international footballers
Vyzas F.C. players
AEK Athens F.C. players
Super League Greece players
Association football midfielders
Footballers from Athens
Greek footballers
Greek football managers
Levadiakos F.C. managers
Athlitiki Enosi Larissa F.C. managers
Road incident deaths in Greece